Zamia encephalartoides is a species of plant in the family Zamiaceae. It is endemic to Colombia. It is threatened by habitat loss. It is found in only two locations in Santander Province, Colombia, which are near the Chicamocha River and Umpala River.

References

encephalartoides
Endemic flora of Colombia
Vulnerable flora of South America
Taxonomy articles created by Polbot